Ramchandra Shripad Jog (Devanagari: रामचंद्र श्रीपाद जोग) (May 15, 1903 - February 21, 1977) was a Marathi writer from Maharashtra, India. He presided over Marathi Sahitya Sammelan at Thane in 1960.

The following is a partial list of Jog's literary works:
 Abhinawa Kawya Prakash (अभिनव काव्यप्रकाश)
 Saundaryashodh Ani Anandabodh (सौंदर्यशोध आणि आनंदबोध) (1943)
 Arwachin Marathi Kawya (अर्वाचीन मराठी काव्य) (1946) 
 Keshawasut Kawya Darshan (केशवसुत काव्यदर्शन) (1947)

References

Culture of Maharashtra
Marathi-language writers
1903 births
1980 deaths
Presidents of the Akhil Bharatiya Marathi Sahitya Sammelan